Carol Adams (born Lurline Uller; March 15, 1918 – April 9, 2012), was an American actress and dancer whose career began as a child in 1923.

Early years
Adams was born Lurline Uller in Los Angeles, California, March 15, 1918. At age 5, Adams was asked to appear in a short subject called Navy Blues where she played a flower girl. She was billed by her birth name until her name was changed when she was 20 and working for Paramount Pictures.

Film
She appeared in episodes of the film serials Our Gang and Mickey McGuire and at age 18 signed a contract with the film studio 20th Century Fox. Two years later, she was under contract with Paramount Pictures and subsequently Republic Pictures. Her obituary in Variety said that she "appeared in some 50 features."

Regarded as one of the foremost tap dance stars in the beginning of the 1940s, Carol Adams was in many Soundies.

Family
In 1944, Adams retired after marrying studio executive Richard J. Pearl.

Death
She died on March 15, 2012, in Los Angeles aged 94. Her survivors included a son, a daughter, six granddaughters, and seven great-grandchildren.

Selected filmography
In Old Chicago (1937)
New Faces of 1937 (1937)
The Life of the Party (1937)
 Love and Hisses (1937)
The Big Broadcast of 1938 (1938)
 Keep Smiling (1938)
Sally, Irene and Mary (1938) 
Rose of Washington Square (1939)
The House Across the Bay (1940)
The Quarterback (1940)
Dancing on a Dime (1940)
Love Thy Neighbor (1940)
Behind the News (1940)
Ridin' on a Rainbow (1941)
Sis Hopkins (1941)
The Gay Vagabond (1941)
Ice-Capades (1941)
Bad Man of Deadwood (1941)
Dick Tracy vs. Crime Inc. (1941)
Blondie Goes to College (1942)
Ever Since Venus (1944). 
Source:

References

External links
 

1918 births
2012 deaths
American silent film actresses
20th-century American actresses